Ptichodis basilans is a moth of the family Erebidae. It is found in Honduras, French Guiana, Venezuela, Brazil (Bahia, Espirito Santo, Rio de Janeiro, Santa Catarina, Rio Grande do Sul) and Paraguay.

References

Moths described in 1852
Ptichodis
Moths of South America
Taxa named by Achille Guenée